Mine's is a tuning firm based in Yokosuka, Kanagawa Prefecture, Japan.

History 
Mine's was started by Tsuzo Niikura in 1985. It attracted attention in 1988 by being among the first Japanese companies to sell re-programmed ECU systems for popular Japanese sports cars. Today it sells many products, ranging from injectors to complete engines. 

Mine's currently makes software upgrades for hundreds of Japanese cars, but only makes hardware upgrades for a few select cars. Its performance upgrades include exhaust systems, engine computers, camshafts, suspension parts, brake systems, and carbon fiber body parts. Mine's is also known for its work on the Nissan Skyline GT-R, specifically the R32, R33, R34 models, as well with the Nissan GT-R R35.

Aside from the Skyline GT-R, Mine's also sells upgrades for other cars such as the Mitsubishi Lancer Evolution, the Subaru Impreza WRX, the Nissan Pulsar GTi-R, and the Nissan Fairlady Z. The Mine's Z is unusual because it remains naturally aspirated, unlike Z's from other tuners.

Mine's has also gained additional popularity through video games, most notably the Gran Turismo and Forza series.

External links
 Mines-wave.com, official website.

Auto parts suppliers of Japan
Automotive companies established in 1985
Automotive motorsports and performance companies
1985 establishments in Japan